KWOZ is a radio station airing a country music format licensed to Mountain View, Arkansas, broadcasting on 103.3 MHz FM.  The station serves the areas of Searcy, Mountain Home, Batesville, and Newport, and is owned by WRD Entertainment, Inc.

References

External links
KWOZ's official website

Country radio stations in the United States
WOZ
Radio stations established in 1981
1981 establishments in Arkansas
Mountain Home, Arkansas